Aventura station is a Brightline station in Ojus, Florida. It is located on West Dixie Highway, west of the Aventura Mall and the city of Aventura. The station is built on land purchased by Brightline (then known as Virgin Trains USA) and donated to Miami-Dade County, which funded a portion of the construction with $76 million. A groundbreaking ceremony was held September 3, 2020. Prior to Brightline's ongoing suspension of service due to the COVID-19 pandemic, the station had been expected to open in the fall of 2021. A ribbon-cutting ceremony was held on December 20, 2022. Despite a scheduled opening date of December 21, 2022, passenger service wouldn't begin until a few days later, on December 24, 2022, due to some last-minute finishing touches to the station.

Inter-city service is provided to MiamiCentral in about 17 minutes, and trains run as far north as West Palm Beach until the Orlando extension is opened in 2023. The station is 34,000 sq ft (3,200 m2) on a 3 acre site. There are 240 parking spaces at the Aventura station, as well as a Miami-Dade Transit bus drop-off. Complimentary shuttle service is available to and from the mall. Brightline has also started the design of another bridge that will connect the platform to Aventura Mall in the future. 

The infill station is expected in the future to serve as the terminus of planned commuter rail services in Miami-Dade County and Broward County. The Miami-Dade line would run between Aventura and MiamiCentral, and the Broward line would operate as far north as Deerfield Beach.

References

Brightline stations
Florida East Coast Railway
Transportation buildings and structures in Miami-Dade County, Florida
Railway stations in the United States opened in 2022